Mary Nawai Martin also known as Mary Mawai is a female South Sudanese politician and the minister of Parliamentary affairs as of 2022

Appointment 
Mary Nawai was appointed as minister of parliamentary affairs on July 28th. 2021 by the president Salva Kiir Mayardit.

See also 

Cabinet of South Sudan

References 

South Sudanese politicians

Year of birth missing (living people)
Living people